Jermaine Gabriel (born March 14, 1990) is a professional Canadian football defensive back who is currently a free agent. He was most recently a member of the Montreal Alouettes of the Canadian Football League (CFL).

Early life
Gabriel was raised in Scarborough. Later, he moved to Calgary and Halifax.

Amateur career
Gabriel played CIS football with the Bishop's Gaiters from 2009 to 2010 while sitting out the 2011 season. He then joined the Calgary Colts of the Canadian Junior Football League for the 2012 season before joining the professional ranks.

Professional career

Toronto Argonauts
Gabriel was drafted 17th overall in the 2013 CFL Draft by the Toronto Argonauts and signed with the club on May 22, 2013. He made the team's active roster following training camp and played in his first career professional game on June 28, 2013 against the Hamilton Tiger-Cats where he recorded three special teams tackles. Later that season, he recorded his first two career sacks in a game against the Montreal Alouettes on September 8, 2013. He later played in his first Grey Cup game during the 2017 season where he recorded four defensive tackles and one forced fumble in the Argonauts' 105th Grey Cup victory over the Calgary Stampeders. 

Overall, Gabriel played in 95 regular season games for the Argonauts where he recorded 239 defensive tackles, seven sacks, two interceptions, four forced fumbles, and scored one touchdown. He became a free agent on February 11, 2020.

Edmonton Eskimos / Elks
On February 13, 2020, Gabriel signed with the Edmonton Eskimos. However, the 2020 CFL season was cancelled and he did not play in 2020. He re-signed with Edmonton to a contract extension through 2021 on December 26, 2020. He played in five regular season games with the newly-named Edmonton Elks before being released on September 24, 2021.

Montreal Alouettes
On October 13, 2021, it was announced that Gabriel had signed with the Montreal Alouettes. He spent the remainder of the season on the practice roster and was released on November 29, 2021.

References

External links
Montreal Alouettes bio 

1990 births
Living people
Bishop's Gaiters football players
Canadian football defensive backs
Canadian Junior Football League players
Edmonton Elks players
Montreal Alouettes players
Players of Canadian football from Ontario
Sportspeople from Scarborough, Toronto
Canadian football people from Toronto
Toronto Argonauts players